The Sierre coach crash occurred on 13 March 2012 near Sierre, Switzerland, when a coach carrying school teachers and pupils crashed into a wall in the Sierre Tunnel. Of the 52 people on board, 28 were killed in the crash, including both drivers, all four teachers, and 22 of the 46 children. The other 24 pupils, all aged between 10 and 12, were injured, including three who were hospitalised with severe brain and chest injuries.

The coach was one of three operated by the Aarschot-based Top Tours company and was transporting mostly Belgian school teachers and students from a skiing holiday in Val d'Anniviers back to their two schools in Belgium. It crashed at around 9.15 pm CET while travelling on the A9 motorway near Sierre, in the southern canton of Valais.

It was Switzerland's second-worst road accident in history and the country's worst in a motorway tunnel. The investigation into the crash initially closed inconclusively in May 2013, having ruled out a number of factors that had been the subject of media speculation but failing to identify a cause. A further public investigation, closing at the end of June 2014, attributed the crash to a non-criminal error on the part of the coach driver. Media speculation has continued.

Circumstances 

The passengers, four teachers and 46 pupils from Saint-Lambertus school in Heverlee, Flemish Brabant, and 't Stekske primary school in Lommel, Limburg, were returning home with two other schools originating from Beersel and Haasrode, Flemish Brabant, having spent the previous few days at a skiing resort in Val d'Anniviers in the Swiss Alps.  

The crash occurred shortly after 9 pm local time (CET) on 13 March 2012, when the coach, while in the Sierre Tunnel, veered and hit a curb, then collided with a concrete wall head-on, at the end of an emergency turnout area. The front portion of the vehicle was severely damaged, initially preventing some survivors from escaping; the side and rear windows of the coach had to be smashed by emergency workers in order to gain access to the trapped passengers.

Rescuers described the scene as "apocalyptic" and some became distressed as they fought to remove dead and injured children from the wreckage. Eight air ambulances and a dozen road ambulances were used to transport victims to several hospitals. The most seriously injured children were flown to hospitals in Bern and Lausanne.

The coach was one of three hired by the group; the other two reached Belgium safely. Among the passengers aboard the crashed bus were 39 Belgians, ten Dutch children, one German child, one British child, and one Polish child.

Passengers 

Most of the passengers aboard the coach were Belgian nationals. Six of the 10 Dutch passengers were killed, as well as one schoolboy with dual Belgian-British nationality.

Cause

The exact cause of the crash has not yet been determined. Tests revealed the driver was not intoxicated with alcohol, did not suffer a heart attack or any other sudden illness, and prosecutors stated he was not exceeding the 100 km/h (62 mph) speed limit at the time of the crash. Experts have narrowed the cause of the crash to either driver fatigue or some sort of undetected medical issue. Police said that the coach, operated by Aarschot-based Top Tours, a company with an "excellent reputation", was a modern and well-maintained vehicle, and that the children had all been wearing the fitted seatbelts at the time of impact.

Both drivers and all four teachers upon the coach died in the accident. However, 24 of the 46 children aboard the vehicle survived and some were able to provide witness statements.

The design of the turnout area, which ended abruptly in a concrete wall, contributed to the severity of the crash.

This accident was reminiscent of the 1988 Måbødalen bus accident in Norway, where a Swedish bus whose brakes had failed collided with the concrete arch at the exit of a long and very steep tunnel.

Reactions
Belgium declared a day of national mourning on 16 March 2012 in memory of the 28 people who died in the crash, including 21 Belgian nationals, with flags being flown at half-mast and a minute's silence being observed. Peter Vanvelthoven, the mayor of Lommel, whose school lost 15 of its 22 pupils and both of the teachers aboard the coach, announced a memorial service the next week in the town, with attendees including the Belgian royal family and Prince Willem-Alexander and Maxima of the Netherlands.

See also 
Beaune coach crash
Måbødalen bus accident

References 

2012 in Switzerland
2012 road incidents in Europe
Bus incidents in Switzerland
March 2012 events in Europe
Tunnel disasters